Saint Paul's College was a private historically black college in Lawrenceville, Virginia. Saint Paul's College opened its doors on September 24, 1888, originally training students as teachers and for agricultural and industrial jobs.

By the late 20th century, Saint Paul's College offered undergraduate degrees for traditional college students and distant learning students in the Continuing Studies Program. The college also offered adult education to help assist working adults to gain undergraduate degrees. Saint Paul's College had a Single Parent Support System Program that assisted single teen parents pursuing a college education.

The college had long struggled with significant financial difficulties, culminating in a court conflict in 2012 with its regional accreditor, the Southern Association of Colleges and Schools. Throughout the 2012–2013 school year, the college sought to merge with another institution, but on June 3, 2013, the board announced the college would close on June 30, 2013.

Campus
Older buildings were constructed by students and donated by friends of the College. The college has been listed on the National Register of Historic Places.

History

On September 24, 1888, James Solomon Russell of the Protestant Episcopal Church founded the Saint Paul Normal and Industrial School, with fewer than a dozen students. The school was intended chiefly to develop African-American teachers, a critical and prestigious job in the late 19th and early 20th-century South. In 1914 the school boasted that "The location of the school in the heart of the Black Belt of Virginia, with a Negro population of 100,000 almost at its very doors, is most favorable for the prosecution of uplift work."

In 1941 the name of the institution was changed to Saint Paul's Polytechnic Institute when the state granted the school authority to offer a four-year program. The first bachelor's degree was awarded in 1944. In 1957 the college adopted its present name to reflect its liberal arts and teacher education curricula.

In June 2012, the college's regional accreditor, the Southern Association of Colleges and Schools Commission on Colleges, stripped the college of its accreditation.  Although the college had been on probation, it lost its accreditation for "violations concerning financial resources, institutional effectiveness in support services, institutional effectiveness in academics and student services, lack of terminal degrees for too many faculty members, and a lack of financial stability."  The college sued the accreditor, and two months later a court issued a preliminary injunction reinstating the college's probationary accreditation to protect it during further legal proceedings. Although supporters worked on plans to have St. Augustine's University in Raleigh, North Carolina, another historically black university of Episcopal heritage, acquire St Paul's, the deal was abandoned in May 2013. Shortly thereafter, St. Paul's College reported to SACS that it would close on June 30, 2013.

In 2017 the Pension Benefit Guaranty Corporation, which had assumed ownership of most of the former campus, sold the property to a Chinese-related firm that has not announced its plans.

Academics
The college focused on liberal arts, social sciences, education, business, mathematics, and natural sciences. It was committed to the development of "students who will be equipped to live effectively in a global society."

Student support
Saint Paul's College developed the Single Parent Support System (SPSS), the only program of its kind in the United States.  Initiated in 1987, the SPSS was an on-campus residential educational program designed for single parents with two or fewer children between the ages of two months to nine years old.

The program required students to attend the college year round on a full-time basis and maintain a projected graduation progression of three to four years, with a 2.5 G.P.A. each year. A significant aspect of the SPSS was a faculty mentoring system that assisted participants with choosing a major. Tutorial assistance and counseling services were available, and the college provided seminars that focused on academic success, transition to college, career planning, and parenting. The college also provided child care assistance.

Athletics
Saint Paul's athletic teams were known as the Tigers and Lady Tigers. The college was a member of the Division II level of the National Collegiate Athletic Association (NCAA), primarily competing in the Central Intercollegiate Athletic Association (CIAA) from 1923–24 to 2010–11.

Saint Paul's competed in 14 intercollegiate varsity sports: Men's sports included baseball, basketball, cross country, football, golf, tennis and track & field; while women's sports included basketball, bowling, cross country, softball, tennis, track & field and volleyball.

The college discontinued its athletic programs in July 2011 in an effort to alleviate financial difficulties. The football team had costs of $300,000 to $400,000 annually.

Notable alumni
 Billy Eckstine – jazz and pop singer, bandleader
 Helen G. Edmonds,  first African-American woman to earn a doctorate from Ohio State University, to become a graduate school dean and the first to second the nomination of a United States presidential candidate.
Darrell Green – former NFL cornerback, inducted into the Pro Football Hall of Fame in 2008.
 Tony Hughes – former head football coach for Jackson State and current associate head coach and tight ends coach for Mississippi State
 Greg Jackson – former head men's basketball coach at Delaware State University
 Sidney Lowe – former head coach for Vancouver Grizzlies and Minnesota Timberwolves; later NC State.
 Martha Namundjebo-Tilahun, businesswoman, former president of the Namibia Chamber for Commerce and Industry
 Stella Oduah – politician, former Minister of Aviation, Nigeria. (disputed by the college as they did not award advanced degrees)
 Antwain Smith – former American professional basketball player.
 Greg Toler – NFL cornerback

References

External links

 
 

 
University and college buildings on the National Register of Historic Places in Virginia
Private universities and colleges in Virginia
Historically black universities and colleges in the United States
Educational institutions established in 1888
Educational institutions disestablished in 2013
Universities and colleges accredited by the Southern Association of Colleges and Schools
Education in Brunswick County, Virginia
Universities and colleges affiliated with the Episcopal Church (United States)
1888 establishments in Virginia
National Register of Historic Places in Brunswick County, Virginia
2013 disestablishments in Virginia
Defunct private universities and colleges in Virginia